The LVII Legislature of the Congress of Mexico met from 1997 to 2000.

Congress of Mexico by session